Ojos de Maricunga is a volcano in the Maricunga Belt of Chile , in the Cordillera Domeyko. 

Ojos de Maricunga is part of the Maricunga Belt, a volcanic area of Oligocene to Pliocene age consisting of lava domes and stratovolcanoes that developed just south of the present-day Central Volcanic Zone of the Andes and is associated with metal ore deposits. The volcano was active during a time in the Miocene where volcanism in the Maricunga belt had increased. Other volcanoes active at that time were Cadillal, Dona Ines, north Jotabeche, La Laguna, Pastillitos, Santa Rosa and Villalobos.

It is the largest stratovolcano of the middle Miocene in the Maricunga Belt . Its exposed surface consists mostly of andesitic lava flows although the volcano itself is formed mostly by pyroclastic flows. It contains a lava dome formed by biotite and hornblende containing dacite . Ignimbrites occur on the foot of the volcano, mostly on the eastern and southwestern side . There appear to be at least two ignimbrites whose composition and age resembles that of Ojos de Maricunga and neighbouring volcanoes . In fact, Ojos de Maricunga may be the source of ash flows .

Volcanic rocks include andesite and dacite, with potassium contents in the middle to high range and elemental compositions reflecting volcanic arc petrologies . Exposures in the caldera have a porphyritic texture . Overall  content of Ojos de Maricunga rocks is 61-64%  and dominant phenocryst phases are plagioclase and additional clinopyroxene, magnetite, orthopyroxene and quartz.

The volcano was active 16-15 million years ago . Potassium-argon dating has been performed both on the central lava dome and the andesite lava flows. The former show ages of 15.8 ± 0.9 million years ago and the latter 15.1 ± 0.7 million years ago . Other ages are 16.2 ± 0.6 and 16.1 ± 0.8 million years ago for the slope deposits . One ignimbrite was erupted 15.8 million years ago. The Ojos de Maricunga ignimbrites were once considered to be Quaternary and that the "San Andes" flows dated at 9.15 ± 0.15 million years ago originated from Ojos de Maricunga . Presently, the volcano is partially eroded .

Santa Rosa volcano has a similar architecture and lies southwest of Ojos de Maricunga. The Salar de Maricunga lies northeast of Ojos de Maricunga. The Laguna Santa Rosa lies southeast of Ojos de Maricunga and the west flowing Quebrada Paipate originates on the volcano's southern slope . The watershed of the Copiapo River borders Ojos de Maricunga to the west . The Cerro Maricunga gold mining project is located on Ojos de Maricunga .

References 

 
 
 
 
 
 

Volcanoes of Chile
Miocene stratovolcanoes